Harrison Sharp (born 4 April 2001), also known as Harry, is a Scottish professional footballer who plays as a goalkeeper for Dundee.

Club career 
Sharp made his debut for Dundee coming off the bench in the Scottish Challenge Cup against Elgin City, after keeper Calum Ferrie was sent off during the game.

In October 2020, Sharp joined Edinburgh City on a season-long loan.

On 7 January 2021, Sharp signed a two-year extension with Dundee, keeping him at the club until 2023. In December 2021, Sharp was listed as an outfield substitute for a Dundee game away to Aberdeen due to a combined injury and COVID-19 crisis within the squad, though spent the entire game on the bench. Sharp made his first start for Dundee in a draw away to Motherwell.

International career 
Sharp was selected for the Scotland under-21 squad in May 2022.

Career Statistics

References 

2001 births
Living people
Scottish footballers
Association football goalkeepers
Dundee F.C. players
F.C. Edinburgh players
Scotland under-21 international footballers
Scotland youth international footballers